"La La La" is a song by American rapper Snoop Lion (mainly known as Snoop Dogg), taken from Snoop Lion's twelfth studio album Reincarnated (2013). The song was written by Snoop, Ariel Rechtshaid, Ken Boothe, Thomas Pentz, Joelle Clarke and William Cole, with production handled by Major Lazer and Dre Skull. "La La La"  was released on July 20, 2012 as the promotional single from the album.

Music video 
The music video, directed by filmmaker Eli Roth, was released on October 31, 2012.

Charts

See also
Kâtibim

References

2012 songs
Snoop Dogg songs
Songs written by Snoop Dogg
Songs written by Diplo
Songs written by Ariel Rechtshaid